The 2011 Toulon Tournament was the 39th edition of the Toulon Tournament and took place from 1 June to 10 June. Ivory Coast were the defending champions, but they failed to win a single match and were eliminated in the group stage.

Colombia won the tournament by defeating France 3–1 in a penalty shoot-out in the final, after the match had finished in a 1–1 draw. James Rodríguez won the Meilleur joueur award for the most outstanding player of the tournament.

Participant teams

Venues
The matches were played in these communes:
Aubagne
Hyères
La Seyne
Le Lavandou
Nice
Saint-Raphaël
Toulon

Squads

Group stage
All times are UTC+2.

Group A

Group B

Knockout stage

All times are UTC+2

Semifinals

Third place play-off

Final

Goalscorers
5 goals
 Steeven Joseph-Monrose

3 goals
 Edwin Cardona

2 goals

 James Rodríguez
 Nicolas Benezet
 Márkó Futács
 Manolo Gabbiadini
 Alberto Paloschi
 Ulises Dávila
 David Izazola
 Amido Baldé

1 goal

 Pei Shuai
 Duván Zapata
 Luis Muriel
 Héctor Quiñones
 José Adolfo Valencia
 Frédéric Duplus
 Fabien Jarsalé
 Anthony Knockaert
 Yannis Tafer
 Márton Eppel
 Máté Katona
 Mattia Destro
 Taufic Guarch
 Carlos Orrantía
 Diego Reyes
 Nélson Oliveira

Own goal
 Pedro Franco (for )

Final standings

External links
Toulon Tournament

 
2011
2010–11 in French football
June 2011 sports events in France